The following is a timeline of the history of the city of Novara (anciently called Novaria) in the Piedmont region of Italy.

Prior to 18th century

 386 - Novaria "dismantled" by Magnus Maximus.
 397 - Roman Catholic Diocese of Novara established (approximate date).
 398 - Gaudentius of Novara becomes bishop.
 405 - Town sacked by forces of Goth Radagaisus.
 450 -  (baptistery) built (approximate date).
 452 - Town sacked by forces of Hun Attila.
 569 - Lombards in power.
 774 - Franks in power.
 830 -  becomes bishop.
 1096 - Birth of Peter Lombard, later a scholastic theologian & Bishop of Paris.
 1110 - Novara sacked by forces of Henry V.
 1123 -  becomes bishop.
 1132 - Cathedral consecrated.
 1168 - Novara joins the Lombard League.
 1178 - Communal palace built.
 1185 - Office of podestà established.
 1277 - Legal code established.
 1332 - Novara becomes part of "Milanese territory."
 1346 - Courthouse built.
 1448 - Sforza in power.
 1513 - 6 June: Battle of Novara (1513) fought during the War of the League of Cambrai.
 1538 - Farnese in power.
 1577 - Basilica of San Gaudenzio rebuilding begins.
 1607 - San Marco church built.(it)
 1664 - Palazzo Cabrino built.

18th and 19th centuries 
 1706 - Novara "occupied by the Savoy troops."
 1734 - Novara "occupied by Charles Emmanuel."
 1798 - Novara occupied by French forces.
 1814 - Novara "restored to Savoy."
 1821 - Austrian-Piedmontese conflict occurs at Novara.
 1838 - Population: 18,524.
 1842 - Market built.
 1847 - Public library founded.
 1849 - Battle of Novara (1849) fought during the First Italian War of Independence.
 1854 - Novara–Alessandria railway begins operating; Novara railway station opens.
 1855 - Arona–Novara railway begins operating.
 1856 - Turin–Novara railway begins operating.
 1859 -  (provincial district) established.
 1861 - Population: 25,144.(it)
 1864 -  begins operating
 1869 - Novara Cathedral rebuilt.
 1871 - Banca Popolare di Novara (bank) in business.
 1881 -  (tram) begins operating.
 1884
 Corriere di Novara newspaper begins publication.
  (tram) begins operating.
 1886 - Novara–Varallo railway begins operating.
 1888 - Teatro Coccia (theatre) opens.
 1897 - Population: 45,189.

20th century
 1911 - Population: 54,571.
 1912 - Novara Calcio (football club) formed.
 1920 - Società Storica Novarese (history society) formed.
 1939 - Biella–Novara railway begins operating.
 1951 - Population: 69,395.(it)
 1952 -  founded.
 1959 - Faraggiana Ferrandi Natural History Museum established.
 1961 - Population: 87,704.(it)
 1970 - Archivio di Stato di Novara (state archives) established.
 1975 -  begins broadcasting.
 1976 - Stadio Silvio Piola (stadium) opens.
 1989 -  founded.
 1996 - Conservatorio Guido Cantelli established.

21st century
 2004 -  begins.
 2013 - Population: 101,933.
 2016 - Local election held; Alessandro Canelli becomes mayor.
 2021 - Novara ramming

See also
 Novara history 
 List of mayors of Novara
 List of bishops of Novara

Timelines of other cities in the macroregion of Northwest Italy:(it)
 Liguria region: Timeline of Genoa 
 Lombardy region: Timeline of Bergamo; Brescia; Cremona; Mantua; Milan; Pavia
 Piedmont region: Timeline of Turin

References

This article incorporates information from the Italian Wikipedia.

Sources

in English

in Italian
 
 
 
 1912 ed.
 
 
  (bibliography)
 
  1907-
 
 N. Bazzetta de Vemenia. Storia della città di Novara, 1931

External links

 Items related to Novara, various dates (via Europeana)
 Items related to Novara, various dates (via Digital Public Library of America)

Novara
Novara
Novara